The NGC 1023 group is a group of galaxies about 20.6 million light-years away from Earth.  It is a group in the Local Supercluster along with the Local Group.

Members

 Probable (dwarfs): DDO 024, DDO 025.
 Possible members: NGC 672, IC 1727, NGC 1156(?).
 Possible (dwarfs): DDO 011, DDO 017, DDO 019, DDO 022, DDO 026.

Map
The location of the NGC 1023 group within the Virgo supercluster (as part of the Laniakea supercluster) can be found near the center of this diagram - below the blue "Local Group" mark.

Literature

References

 
Galaxy clusters
Virgo Supercluster